July Jones was an actor who had leading roles in several American films with African American casts.

Filmography
Beale Street Mama (1946)
Dirty Gertie from Harlem U.S.A. (1946)
Juke Joint (film) (1947)
The Girl in Room 20 (1949)

References

Year of birth missing (living people)
Living people
African-American male actors
20th-century American male actors
20th-century African-American people
21st-century African-American people